John B. Frisbee (January 7, 1825 – September 9, 1903) was a Union Navy sailor in the American Civil War and a recipient of the U.S. military's highest decoration, the Medal of Honor, for his actions at the Battle of Forts Jackson and St. Philip.

Biography
Frisbee was born on January 7, 1825, in Phippsburg, Maine. At the Battle of Forts Jackson and St. Philip near New Orleans on April 24, 1862, Pinola's berth deck was struck by shellfire and set aflame. Frisbee prevented the fire from spreading to the ship's stored gunpowder by shutting himself into the magazine. For this action, he was awarded the Medal of Honor a year later on April 3, 1863. He was discharged in October 1863.

Frisbee's official Medal of Honor citation reads:
The President of the United States of America, in the name of Congress, takes pleasure in presenting the Medal of Honor to Gunner's Mate John B. Frisbee, United States Navy, for extraordinary heroism in action while serving on board the U.S. Steam Gunboat Pinola during action against Forts Jackson and St. Philip, Louisiana, and during the taking of New Orleans, 24 April 1862. While engaged in the bombardment of Fort St. Philip, Gunner's Mate Frisbee, acting courageously and without personal regard, closed the powder magazine which had been set afire by enemy shelling and shut off his avenue of escape, thereby setting a high example of bravery. He served courageously throughout these engagements which resulted in the taking of the Forts Jackson and St. Philip and in the surrender of New Orleans.

Frisbee died on September 9, 1903, at age 78 and was buried in Winnegance, Maine.

See also

List of American Civil War Medal of Honor recipients: A–F

References

External links

1825 births
1903 deaths
People from Sagadahoc County, Maine
People of Maine in the American Civil War
Union Navy sailors
United States Navy Medal of Honor recipients
American Civil War recipients of the Medal of Honor
People from Brookline, Massachusetts